Sagnat is a commune in the Creuse department in the Nouvelle-Aquitaine region in central France.

Geography

Population

Sights
 The church, dating from the twelfth century.
 The ancient stone cross on the square.

See also
Communes of the Creuse department

References

Communes of Creuse